The Return of Mary is a 1918 American silent drama film, directed by Wilfred Lucas. It stars May Allison, Clarence Burton, and Claire McDowell, and was released on September 23, 1918.

Cast list
 May Allison as Mary
 Clarence Burton as John Denby
 Claire McDowell as Mrs. John Denby, Sr.
 Darrell Foss as Jack Denby
 Frank Brownlee as John Graham
 Joseph Belmont as the butler, Clark

References

External links 
 
 
 

American silent feature films
American black-and-white films
1918 drama films
1918 films
Films directed by Wilfred Lucas
Silent American drama films
1910s English-language films
1910s American films